"Shinobi vs. Dragon Ninja" is a song by Welsh rock band Lostprophets. The song was released in 2001 as the first single from the band's debut studio album, The Fake Sound of Progress. It was the only charting single on the Billboard charts from the album, and was still on the band's tour setlist when they broke up in 2013.

Writing and production 
The band wrote the song in under an hour. According to frontman Ian Watkins, it is a song about nostalgia for when the band were growing up together in their home town of Pontypridd, South Wales, and was originally inspired by the Shinobi arcade game they used to play at the Park View Café in Pontypridd. The song's name is derived from the video games Shinobi and Bad Dudes vs. DragonNinja.

Release and reception 
"Shinobi vs. Dragon Ninja" was released in the summer of 2001 and became the most successful song from The Fake Sound of Progress on the American rock charts. It appeared on Billboard magazine's Modern Rock Tracks chart at 33. In the United Kingdom the single peaked at 41 on the UK Singles Chart in 2001 and stayed on the charts for two weeks. After the release of the follow-up single "The Fake Sound of Progress" in 2002 "Shinobi vs. Dragon Ninja" re-charted and peaked at 161. The song was featured on the soundtrack of ATV Offroad Fury 2.

Music video
The video for this single is one of few Lostprophets videos actually filmed in the UK. It features the band performing to a crowd of people on the roof of a disused multi-storey car park in Edmonton, North London. The video received significant airplay on MTV2. The music video was directed by Mike Piscitelli, who would direct the music video for "The Fake Sound of Progress," the follow-up single to "Shinobi vs. Dragon Ninja." The shooting for the music video started on 5 October on a Friday at an undisclosed location. Any fan that wanted to participate in the music video could simply email their name, age, gender and contact number to the band. Once the email was received, the band chose who they wanted to include in the music video. An alternate version of the music video exists in a completely different setting, showing the band performing live. This version was also shot in black and white.

Track listing

Personnel

 Ian Watkins – lead vocals
 Lee Gaze – lead guitar
 Mike Lewis – rhythm guitar
 Stuart Richardson – bass guitar
 Mike Chiplin – drums, percussion
 Jamie Oliver – synth, turntables, samples

Chart positions

References 

Lostprophets songs
2001 debut singles
Works about video games
2000 songs